Found On Film is a multimedia release by Maxïmo Park containing a DVD principally of live footage and a CD of live session recordings from the BBC. Like the b-sides compilation Missing Songs, it was released to complement the success of their debut album A Certain Trigger. The two discs come in a hardcover book case with several pages of photos taken by the band over the course of the tour for the album. The name is taken from the lyrics of the last single from A Certain Trigger, 'I Want You To Stay'.

DVD contents 
Found On Film: A Certain Trigger Tour Documentary.

Live At Brixton Academy

The music that plays over the end credits is an excerpt of the Field Music and J. Xaverre Remix of 'I Want You To Stay'.

Live At Newcastle Academy

Music videos for:

AOL live session videos for:

BBC Live Sessions CD

Total running time approx. 2 hours and 23 minutes.

Trivia
A mistake on the back of the Found On Film DVD reads: "Live at Newcastle Academy (Filmed 10/12/06)", when they in fact played there on 10/12/05. The DVD got released a good four months before 10/12/06.

The Brixton Academy concert was originally shot for MTV. Filmed 17/02/05, it was directed by James Russell with seven cameras at his disposal.

The titular tour documentary, Found On Film, was made by Film Bee, a group of artist filmmakers and also friends of the band. It was shot exclusively on Super 8 film to intimately capture the excitement of the band's first major UK tour.

External links
Official Found on Film site
Found on Film at Discogs

Maxïmo Park video albums
2006 live albums
Live video albums
2006 video albums